Essig is an unincorporated community in Brown County, Minnesota, United States. Essig has a post office with ZIP code 56030.

Demographics

History
A post office called Essig has been in operation since 1886. The community was named for one of the Essig brothers who had built the first business there.

References

Unincorporated communities in Brown County, Minnesota
Unincorporated communities in Minnesota